The fifth and final season of Bates Motel aired from February 20-April 24, 2017. The season consisted of 10 episodes and aired on Mondays at 10 p.m. ET/PT on A&E. The series itself is described as a "contemporary prequel" to the 1960 film Psycho, following the life of Norman Bates and his mother Norma prior to the events portrayed in the Hitchcock film. The final season of the series loosely adapts the plot of Psycho. The series takes place in the fictional town of White Pine Bay, Oregon.

The season was released on Blu-ray and DVD on September 19, 2017.

Cast and characters

Main

 Vera Farmiga as Mother
 Freddie Highmore as Norman Bates 
 Max Thieriot as Dylan Massett 
 Olivia Cooke as Emma Decody
 Nestor Carbonell as Alex Romero

Recurring
 Kenny Johnson as Caleb Calhoun
 Ryan Hurst as Chick Hogan
 Brooke Smith as Sheriff Jane Greene
 Isabelle McNally as Madeleine Loomis
 Austin Nichols as Sam Loomis
 Jillian Fargey as Maggie Summers
 Damon Gupton as Dr. Gregg Edwards
 Natalia Cordova-Buckley as Julia Ramos

Special guest
 Rihanna as Marion Crane

Guest
 Carlton Cuse as Highway Patrol Officer
 Raphael Sbarge as George Lowery
 John Hainsworth as Jim Blackwell 
 Antonio Cayonne as Bruce Herman
 Ian Tracey as Remo

Production

Casting
In June 2016, showrunner Kerry Ehrin confirmed the return of Kenny Johnson as Caleb Calhoun for the final season. The following month, Rihanna was cast in the iconic role of Marion Crane. In September, Isabelle McNally joined the cast of the series, portraying the role of Madeleine Loomis, a young woman who resembles Norma. The same month, Brooke Smith joined the cast as Sheriff Jane Greene. The following year in January, Austin Nichols was cast in the role of Sam Loomis, a prominent role in both the source material and the film adaptation. Ryan Hurst returned as Chick Hogan. The series executive producer Carlton Cuse appeared as a police officer trailing Marion Crane. Natalia Cordova-Buckley joined the cast as Julia Ramos, an attorney.

Filming
The series was filmed on location in Aldergrove, British Columbia. At the beginning of the first season, a replica of the original Bates Motel set from the film Psycho was built on 272nd Street. Freddie Highmore was tapped to write an episode for the season, as well as direct an episode, marking his directorial debut. Max Thieriot and Nestor Carbonell were also tapped to direct an episode each for season 5.

Production on the season began on September 16, 2016. The series filmed its final scenes at the specially-built Bates Motel set in Aldergrove on January 25, 2017, and production began tearing the house down the following day. Carbonell filmed his final scenes as Sheriff Alex Romero on January 27. Filming officially wrapped for the series on January 31. Later in February, the Bates Motel exterior set in Aldergrove was subsequently demolished.

Episodes

Reception

Critical response
The season has received positive reviews from television critics. It received 81 out of 100 from Metacritic, based on 8 reviews, indicating "universal acclaim". Review aggregator website Rotten Tomatoes reported that 21 out of 21 critical responses were positive, averaging a 100% rating.

Ratings
Overall, the fifth season of Bates Motel averaged 1.29 million viewers, with a 0.5 rating in the 18–49 demographic.

 A  Cable Live +3 data is used here as Live +7 was not made available.

Awards and nominations

In its fifth and final season, Bates Motel was nominated for one award.

References

External links
 
 

Season 5
2017 American television seasons